Articles related to the French overseas department of Martinique include:

0–9

.mq – Internet country code top-level domain for Martinique
1891 Martinique hurricane
1928 Okeechobee hurricane

A
A1 autoroute (Martinique)
Airports in Martinique
Aimé Césaire
Alexandre, vicomte de Beauharnais
Alfred Marie-Jeanne
Amphicyclotulus liratus
Americas
North America
North Atlantic Ocean
West Indies
Mer des Caraïbes (Caribbean Sea)
Antilles
Petites Antilles (Lesser Antilles)
Islands of Martinique
Antillean Creole language
Antillean fruit-eating bat
Antillean giant rice rat
Antilles
Arrondissement of Fort-de-France
Arrondissement of La Trinité
Arrondissement of Le Marin
Arrondissement of Saint-Pierre, Martinique
Arrondissements of the Martinique department
Atlas of Martinique

B
Barbados–France relations
Basse-Pointe
Battle of Fort Royal, 1781
Battle of Martinique (1780)
Bellefontaine, Martinique
Bibliography of Martinique
Biguine
Bothrops lanceolatus
British expedition against Martinique
Build the Martinique Country

C
Cantons of the Martinique department
Canton of Basse-Pointe
Canton of Case-Pilote-Bellefontaine
Canton of Ducos
Canton of Gros-Morne
Canton of La Trinité
Canton of L'Ajoupa-Bouillon
Canton of Le Carbet
Canton of Le Diamant
Canton of Le Lorrain
Canton of Le Marigot
Canton of Le Marin
Canton of Le Morne-Rouge
Canton of Le Prêcheur
Canton of Le Vauclin
Canton of Les Anses-d'Arlet
Canton of Les Trois-Îlets
Canton of Macouba
Canton of Rivière-Pilote
Canton of Rivière-Salée
Canton of Sainte-Anne
Canton of Sainte-Luce
Canton of Saint-Esprit
Canton of Saint-Joseph
Canton of Saint-Pierre
Capital of Martinique:  Fort-de-France
Carbet Mountains
Carib Expulsion
Caribbean
Caribbean Carnival
Caribbean Sea
Case-Pilote
Categories:
:Category:Martinique
:Category:Buildings and structures in Martinique
:Category:Communications in Martinique
:Category:Economy of Martinique
:Category:Environment of Martinique
:Category:Geography of Martinique
:Category:History of Martinique
:Category:Martinican culture
:Category:Martinique stubs
:Category:Martinique-related lists
:Category:People from Martinique
:Category:Politics of Martinique
:Category:Society of Martinique
:Category:Sport in Martinique
:Category:Transport in Martinique
commons:Category:Martinique
Cave swallow
Chouval bwa
Coat of arms of Martinique
Communes of the Martinique department
Coralie Balmy
Créolité
Culture of Martinique

D
Demographics of Martinique
Diamond Rock
Ducos

E
Eastern Caribbean Gas Pipeline Company Limited
Economy of Martinique
Édouard Glissant
Elections in Martinique
Euro

F

Fabrice Jeannet
Flag of France
Flag of Martinique
Fonds-Saint-Denis
Football in Martinique
Fort Desaix
Fort Saint Louis (Martinique)
Fort-de-France – Capital of Martinique
Fort-de-France 1st Canton
Fort-de-France 2nd Canton
Fort-de-France 3rd Canton
Fort-de-France 4th Canton
Fort-de-France 5th Canton
Fort-de-France 6th Canton
Fort-de-France 7th Canton
Fort-de-France 8th Canton
Fort-de-France 9th Canton
Fort-de-France 10th Canton
Fort-de-France Bay
Fort-de-France Cathedral
France
Frantz Fanon
French America
French colonization of the Americas
French language
French overseas department of Martinique (Région Martinique)
French Republic (République française)
 French West Indies

G
Geography of Martinique
Giant ditch frog
Grand'Rivière
Great Hurricane of 1780
Gros-Morne, Martinique

H
Havivra Da Ifrile
Hinduism in Martinique
History of Martinique
Hurricane Dean
Hurricane Klaus (1990)

I
International Organization for Standardization (ISO)
ISO 3166-1 alpha-2 country code for Martinique: MQ
ISO 3166-1 alpha-3 country code for Martinique: MTQ
Islands of Martinique:
Martinique
Bats Island
Bonchard
Cay Pinsonelle
Diamond Rock
Dupre Island
Gros Ilet
Grotte Rock
Ile Chancel
Ile Petite Grenade
Ilet A Eau
Ilet A Ramiers
Ilet A Tois Roux
Ilet Au Rat
Ilet Aubin
Ilet Baude
Ilet Boisseau
Ilet Cabrits
Ilet Chevalier
Ilet De La Rose
Ilet Des Chardons
Ilet Du Galion
Ilet Duchamp
Ilet Duquesnay
Ilet Fregate
Ilet Hardy
Ilet La Perle
Ilet Lapin
Ilet Lavigne
Ilet Lezard
Ilet Long
Ilet Madame
Ilet Metrente
Ilet Oscar
Ilet Pele
Ilet Petit Piton
Ilet Petit Vincent
Ilet Petite Martinique
Ilet Ragot
Ilet Ramville
Ilet Sainte-Marie
Ilet Tartane
Ilet Thiery
Ilets Aux Chiens
Les Trois Ilets
Petit Ilet Duprey
Petit Ilet
Sugarloaf Rock
Table Au Diable
Trou Terre Island

J
Jean-Baptiste Labat
Jean-Michel Sigere
Jérôme Jeannet
Joël Abati
Joséphine de Beauharnais

K
Kadans

L
La Savane
La Trinité, Martinique
L'Ajoupa-Bouillon
Le Carbet
Le Diamant
Le François 1st Canton Nord
Le François 2nd Canton Sud
Le François
Le Lamentin 1st Canton Sud-Bourg
Le Lamentin 2nd Canton Nord
Le Lamentin 3rd Canton Est
Le Lamentin
Le Lorrain
Le Marigot
Le Marin
Le Morne-Rouge
Le Morne-Vert
Le Prêcheur
Le Robert 1st Canton Sud
Le Robert 2nd Canton Nord
Le Robert
Le Tour de Yoles Rondes de Martinique
Le Vauclin
Léon Compère-Léandre
Les Anses-d'Arlet
Les Trois-Îlets
Lesser Antilles
Lewoz
Ligue de football de la Martinique
Liophis cursor
Lists related to Martinique:
List of airports in Martinique
List of extinct animals of Martinique and Guadeloupe
List of islands of Martinique
List of mammals in Martinique
List of Martinique films
List of Martinique-related topics
List of political parties in Martinique
List of rivers of Martinique
List of volcanoes in Martinique
Ludger Sylbaris
Lydie Denier

M
Macouba
Majestik Zouk
Mammals of Martinique
Manuela Ramin-Osmundsen
Martinican, adjective or noun
Martinican Communist Party
Martinican Independence Movement
Martinican Progressive Party
Martinique's 1st constituency, French National Assembly
Martinique's 2nd constituency
Martinique's 3rd constituency
Martinique's 4th constituency
Martiniquais, noun or adjective
Martinique (Région Martinique)
Martinique Aimé Césaire International Airport
Martinique films
Martinique franc
Martinique national football team
Martinique national rugby union team
Martinique oriole
Martinique Passage
Mer des Caraïbes
Mount Pelée
Music of Martinique

N
North America
North Atlantic Ocean
Northern Hemisphere

P
Petites Antilles
Pierre Belain d'Esnambuc
Pine warbler
Political parties in Martinique
Politics of Martinique

R
Région Martinique (Martinique)
République française (French Republic)
Rivers of Martinique
Rivière-Pilote
Rivière-Salée
Roman Catholic Archdiocese of Fort-de-France

S
Saint Lucia Channel
Sainte-Anne, Martinique
Sainte-Luce, Martinique
Sainte-Marie 1st Canton Nord
Sainte-Marie 2nd Canton Sud
Sainte-Marie, Martinique
Saint-Esprit
Saint-Joseph, Martinique
Saint-Pierre, Martinique
Schœlcher 1st Canton
Schœlcher 2nd Canton
Schœlcher
Scouting in Martinique
Serge Larcher
Suzanne Césaire

T
Take Air
Thierry Henry
Transport in Martinique
Tropical Storm Dorothy (1970)

V
Vanessa Beauchaints
Volcanoes of Martinique

W
West Indies
Western Hemisphere

Z
Zouk

See also

List of Caribbean-related topics
List of international rankings
Lists of country-related topics
Topic outline of geography
Topic outline of North America

References

External links

 
Martinique